Dick Ukeiwé (13 December 1928 – 3 September 2013) was a New Caledonian politician. Born in Lifou, France, he represented the island in the French Senate from 1983 until 1992, and was a member of the Rally for the Republic. He served as President of the Congress of New Caledonia from 1985 to 1988. His son, Bernard Ukeiwé (1953–2008), was also a New Caledonian politician. Ukeiwé died, aged 84, on 3 September 2013 in Dumbéa.

References

1928 births
2013 deaths
French Senators of the Fifth Republic
New Caledonia politicians
Kanak people
Rally for the Republic politicians
Black French politicians
People from the Loyalty Islands
Senators of New Caledonia
Presidents of the Congress of New Caledonia